William Anthony Nericcio, aka Memo, is a Chicano literary theorist, cultural critic, American Literature scholar, and Professor of English and Comparative Literature at San Diego State University. Currently Director of the Master of Arts in Liberal Arts and Sciences program, he is the author of the award-winning Tex[t]-Mex: Seductive Hallucinations of the "Mexican" in America, The Hurt Business: Oliver Mayer's Early Works Plus, and Homer From Salinas: John Steinbeck's Enduring Voice for the Californias. Nericcio is also a graphic designer, creating book covers, film posters, and websites, most notably for SDSU Press and Hyperbole Books, where he oversees the production of cultural studies tomes. His Text-Mex Gallery blog investigates the pathological interrogation of Mexican, Latina/o, Chicana/o, "Hispanic," Mexican-American, and Latin American stereotypes, political, and cultural issues.  He is also the curator of the text-image exhibition entitled “MEXtasy,” which has been displayed at numerous institutions, including University of Michigan and South Texas College. Currently working on his follow-up book to Tex[t]-Mex, Eyegiene: Permutations of Subjectivity in the Televisual Age of Sex and Race, his most recent publication is Talking #browntv: Latinas and Latinos on the Screen, co-authored with Frederick Luis Aldama, for the Ohio State University Press.

Life and education 

William Anthony Nericcio was born in Laredo, Texas, but with ancestry that hails from General Téran and Monterrey, Mexico, Partanna, Sicily, and England, and considers himself post-Movimiento Chicano. Nericcio received his BA in English from the University of Texas at Austin in 1984, then went on to complete his doctoral degree in Comparative Literature from Cornell University in 1989, with a dissertation entitled The Politics of Solitude: Alienation in the Literatures of the Americas. Nericcio's dissertation director was Enrico Mario Santí—other members of his committee included Henry Louis Gates, Jr. and Kathleen Newman.  While at Cornell, Nericcio served as a graduate research and teaching assistant to Carlos Fuentes at the A.D. White House Society for the Humanities.

Academic career
After completing his doctoral degree in Comparative Literature at Cornell University, Nericcio accepted the position of Assistant Professor at University of Connecticut, before joining the Department of English and Comparative Literature at San Diego State University (SDSU). There, he served two years as the Chair of the Department of English and Comparative Literature from August 2007 through October 2009, where he worked successfully to diversify the professoriate and the curriculum. He is now Director of the Master of Arts in Liberal Arts and Sciences program. He also serves on the faculties of the Chicana/o Studies Department, the Master of Arts in Liberal Arts and Sciences (MALAS), and the Center for Latin American Studies.

His scholarship focuses on Chicano literature and film, Mexican-American cultural studies, continental philosophy, psychoanalysis, and global popular culture. Two of his books--The Hurt Business: Oliver Mayer's Early Works Plus, and Homer From Salinas: John Steinbeck's Enduring Voice for the Californias—were both published by SDSU Press's Hyperbole Books imprint.

His most well-known book Tex[t]-Mex: Seductive Hallucinations of the "Mexican" in America (University of Texas 2006), deals with popular representation of Mexican and Mexican-American identity. It was named ‘Outstanding Academic Title’ 2007 by the American Library Association in the category of Film Studies.

Awards
San Diego State University, College of Arts and Letters, Tenured Faculty Teaching Award, 2013-2014.

American Library Association Outstanding Academic Title in Film Studies, 2007 
Nominee, U.S. Professor of the Year award, The Carnegie Foundation for the Advancement of Teaching, Fall 1999
Nominee, Most Influential Professor, Quest For the Best, Office of the Vice President, San Diego State University, Spring 1999 
Associated Students’ "Outstanding Faculty," The Associated Student Government of SDSU, San Diego State University, 1994-1994

Selected works 
Talking #BrownTV: Latinas and Latinos on the Screen. Columbus: Ohio State University Press, 2019
Tex[t]-Mex: Seductive Hallucinations of the "Mexican" in America. Austin: University of Texas Press, 2006
Homer From Salinas: John Steinbeck's Enduring Voice for California. San Diego: The San Diego State University Press, 2009
The Hurt Business: Oliver Mayer's Early Works [+] Plus a Portfolio of Plays, Essays, Interviews, Souvenirs, Ephemera, and Photography. San Diego, Hyperbole Books, 2008

Reviews of Tex[t]-Mex: Seductive Hallucinations of the Mexican in America
  	Aztlán: A Journal of Chicano Studies. Spring 2008.
 "The Seductive Style of a Tex-Mex Cultural Critic." A Contra/Corriente. Fall 2007.
 CHOICE: Current Reviews for Academic Libraries. October 2007.
 

Aldama, Frederick Luis (March 2008). "Book Review." MELUS: Multi-Ethnic Literature of the United States. 33 (1): 183-185. Retrieved 17 October 2017. 14

Graphic Design and MEXtasy Art Director/Designer
In addition to this academic career, Nericcio is also a graphic designer. His work includes book covers, film posters, and websites, most notably for SDSU Press and Hyperbole Books, where he oversees the production of cultural studies tomes. His Text-Mex Galleryblog investigates the pathological interrogation of Mexican, Latina/o, Chicana/o, "Hispanic," Mexican-American, and Latin American stereotypes, political, and cultural issues.  In late 2010, Nericcio began a text-image exhibition entitled “MEXtasy,” which has been displayed at numerous institutions.

MEXtasy Exhibitions (Abridged Listing)

2020 
The Mextasy exhibition, in addition to screenings of the Mextasy TV pilot, will be featured at the University of Detroit, Mercy, and the University of Michigan, March, 2020.

2019 
The Mextasy exhibition will be featured from Sept 10 to October 30, 2019 at the Multicultural Center, Memorial Union, Iowa State University.

2018
Franklin and Marshall College, March 28, 2018, hosted by the Department of Spanish and Linguistics

2017
San Diego State University hosted by SDSU's Malcolm A. Love Library

2016
University of Pennsylvania hosted by MEChA de Penn, Mex@Penn, & SHPE

University of Arizona's Department of Spanish and Portuguese Annual Graduate and Professional Symposium on Hispanic and Luso-Brazilian Literature, Language and Culture at the Arizona Historical Society Museum and at the University of Arizona main campus

2015
University of California, San Diego hosted by The Filmatic Festival

2014
University of Illinois Urbana-Champaign at La Casa Cultura Latina
Department of Communications and the Chicano Studies at University of Texas at El Paso

2012
Ohio State University 
University of Guelph, Guelph, Ontario 
theFront, San Ysidro, California (as Xicanoholic)
Xicanoholic Lucha Libre: Gustavo Arellano and Bill Nericcio at theFRONT (Video)
Ethnic Studies Department, University of Colorado at Boulder 
Western University, London, Ontario 
Adrian College 
University of California, Los Angeles 
Boise State University

2011
Kamakakūokalani Center for Hawaiian Studies, University of Hawai'i at Manoa 
Fullerton Public Library (hosted by Gustavo Arellano), Fullerton, California 
San Antonio College, San Antonio, Texas
The Centro Cultural de La Raza, in Balboa Park, San Diego, California
Department of American Studies, University of Michigan 
Casa Familiar, in San Ysidro, California (as Xicanoholic)

2010
South Texas College's Pecan campus Art Gallery
The Laredo Center of the Arts at Laredo, Texas

Interviews

See also 

American Literature
Comparative Literature
Cultural Studies
Literary theory
Film Studies

References

External links 
Bio, Dr. William A. Nericcio @ SDSU
webINDEX, Memo @ SDSU
memogr@phics, William Anthony Nericcio's graphic design portfolio
Text-Mex Galleryblog, William Anthony Nericcio's online supplement to his book "Tex[t]-Mex: Seductive Hallucinations of the "Mexican" in America"
MEXtasy Exhibit Site

Living people
San Diego State University faculty
American academics of English literature
American literary critics
Teachers of English
Comparative literature academics
Year of birth missing (living people)